Lychno is a rural locality (a village) in Posyolok imeni Zhelyabovo, Ustyuzhensky District, Vologda Oblast, Russia. The population was 83 as of 2002. There are 3 streets.

Geography 
Osnopolye is the nearest rural locality.

References 

Rural localities in Ustyuzhensky District